The Lawndale Railway and Industrial Company operated a  narrow gauge railroad from Shelby to Lawndale, North Carolina from 1899 to 1943. It served the Cleveland Cotton Mills in Shelby, as well as a cotton mill at Double Shoals, and also hauled agricultural products and supplies, coal, and general merchandise.

References

Narrow gauge railroads in North Carolina
Defunct North Carolina railroads
3 ft gauge railways in the United States